The 2016 State of the Nation Address was the first State of the Nation Address delivered by President Rodrigo Duterte.

Seating and guests
Three former Presidents, Fidel Ramos, Joseph Estrada, and Gloria Macapagal Arroyo attended the SONA. This was the first time that Arroyo attended Congress after being detained for four years at the Veterans Memorial Medical Center in Quezon City, after the Supreme Court voted 11-4, dismissing the plunder case filed against her in connection with the alleged misuse of the Philippine Charity Sweepstakes Office's P366-million intelligence fund.

Among those who also attended were Vice President Leni Robredo, Chief Justice Maria Lourdes Sereno, and Papal Nuncio and Head of the Diplomatic Corps, Giuseppe Pinto. Former President and Duterte's predecessor, Benigno Aquino III skipped the event.

Preparations

Independent film director Brillante Mendoza has accepted the offer by PCO Secretary Martin Andanar to direct the first State of the Nation Address of President Duterte. Andanar held a meeting, with Mendoza, director and TV host Jun Sabayton and PCO Assistant Secretary for Strategic Communications Ramon Cualoping III to discuss several details of the SONA.

Mayor Herbert Bautista announced that there will be no classes in all levels in Quezon City on the day of the State of the Nation Address itself, particularly in schools near the Batasang Pambansa.

Program
President Duterte arrived at the Session Hall of the House of Representatives at 4:00pm (PST). After the President's arrival, Senate President Koko Pimentel and House Speaker Pantaleon Alvarez convened the joint session of both houses. The national anthem was sung by folk singer Bayang Barrios, followed by an interfaith unity prayer led by representatives from the Catholic Church, Protestants, Muslims and the Iglesia ni Cristo.

The original speech of the president was intended to last for about 38 minutes, but due to additional ad libs of Duterte, the first State of the Nation Address ran for 1 hour and 33 minutes.

After the joint session was adjourned, Militant groups who just finished a demonstration rally outside the Batasang Pambansa to show their support to the Duterte administration went on a meeting with President Duterte.

Address content and delivery
President Duterte began his first SONA that he will not resort into fingerpointing against the past administration.

References

External links
Transcript of President Duterte's State of the Nation Address
Full video of the 2016 State of the Nation Address

State of the Nation Address
2016 speeches
2016
Presidency of Rodrigo Duterte
Speeches by Rodrigo Duterte